Kuberakolam (also written as Kubera kolam) is a certain magic square of order three constructed using rice flour and drawn on the floors of several houses in South India. In Hindu mythology, Kubera is the god of riches and wealth, and it is believed that if one worships the Kubera kolam as ordained in the scriptures, he/she will be rewarded with wealth and prosperity.  
A kolam is a drawing composed of lines and loops, drawn around a grid pattern of dots. In many places in South India, this form of painting is drawn using rice powder /chalk/chalk powder and colored powders.

The construction of Kubera kolam
The Kubera kolam magic square is formed by the numbers 20, 21, 22, 23, 24, 25, 26, 27, 28 in the arrangement depicted below:

In this magic square, the numbers in each row, and in each column, and the numbers in the forward and backward main diagonals, all add up to the same number, namely, 72.
To construct the Kubera kolam, the lines are drawn first. The numbers are then written in the following order: 24, 28, 23, 22, 27, 20, 25, 26, 21 in that order. A coin and a flower are usually placed in each cell.

In literature
The Lost Symbol, a 2009 novel written by American writer Dan Brown, contains a brief reference to Kubera kolam.

In science
Attempts have been made to use the Kubera Kolam to introduce  randomization in image steganography.

References

Tamil culture